"The Front" is the nineteenth episode of the fourth season of the American animated television series The Simpsons. It originally aired in the United States on the Fox network on April 15, 1993. In the episode, Bart and Lisa decide to write an episode of The Itchy & Scratchy Show; after their script is rejected, they resubmit it under the name of their grandfather Abraham Simpson, resulting in Grampa being hired as a staff writer. Meanwhile, Homer returns to high school to retake a failed science course.

The episode was written by Adam I. Lapidus and directed by Rich Moore. It is the only Simpsons episode written by Lapidus.

Plot
After being disappointed by a new episode of Itchy & Scratchy, Bart and Lisa decide that they can write a better one themselves. Inspired by the sight of Homer accidentally slicing Marge's hair off with hedge shears, they write a script titled "Little Barbershop of Horrors", but their episode is rejected by Roger Meyers Jr., head of Itchy & Scratchy International. Correctly guessing that Meyers did not take them seriously because they were children, they resubmit the manuscript under Grampa's name, leading Meyers to hire Grampa as a staff writer. Bart and Lisa inform Grampa of their scheme, and the trio conspire to continue passing off Bart and Lisa's scripts as Grampa's, splitting the money three ways. Bart and Lisa’s cartoons are met with acclaim from audiences, resulting in Meyers firing Itchy & Scratchy’s entire writing staff, except for Grampa.

For his work on Itchy & Scratchy, Grampa is nominated for an award for Outstanding Writing in a Cartoon Series. When Grampa sees Itchy & Scratchy for the first time in a clip show introducing the award, he is appalled at the violent humor, and turns his acceptance speech into an assault on both the cartoon and the audience amused by it. He storms off the stage amidst jeers and thrown vegetables. Grampa gives the award to Bart and Lisa, and Bart swears never to watch an award show again, unless Billy Crystal is featured.

In the subplot, Homer and Marge attend their "Class of 1974" high school reunion, where they have a great time and Homer wins a variety of humorous awards. However, Principal Dondelinger interrupts the ceremony to announce that Homer technically never graduated from high school due to failing a remedial science course and revokes all of Homer's awards. Determined to win back the accolades, Homer retakes the course and passes the final exam, finally graduating.

The episode concludes with a self-contained segment, complete with its own theme song, titled The Adventures of Ned Flanders. In the sketch, itself titled "Love That God", Ned is upset with his sons for not wanting to go to church, until they inform him that it is Saturday, and he laughs at his mistake.

Production

"The Front" was written by Adam I. Lapidus and directed by Rich Moore. In the early 1990s, Lapidus saw a news report on television about three 13-year-old girls – Renee Carter, Sarah Creef, and Amy Crosby – who had written a script for Tiny Toon Adventures, titled "Buster and Babs Go Hawaiian". The show's executive producer, Steven Spielberg, liked the script so much that he brought the three to Hollywood to work on the episode with the show's writing staff. Upon seeing the report, Lapidus thought, "That would really be a neat idea for Bart and Lisa." He wrote a spec script, which made its way via executive producer James L. Brooks to the Simpsons staff, who hired Lapidus to work with them on the episode. "The Front" is the only Simpsons episode written by Lapidus, causing some dispute among the show's fans whether he actually exists or was perhaps a pseudonym. Lapidus' mother-in-law came upon one such debate on an Internet forum.

The initial running time for "The Front" was "way, way short", and the writers had to use "every trick in the book" to make the episode reach the minimum length. Even after greatly expanding the original script and adding an extra-long couch gag during the opening sequence, the episode was still one minute too short; The Adventures of Ned Flanders was added to address the problem. The segment, which plays at the end of the episode, was designed purely as filler and had nothing to do with the other events of the episode. Showrunner Mike Reiss later commented, "As always, when we try something bold and new the general reaction is, 'What the hell was that? The scene was also an homage to Archie Comics, which sometimes used a similar technique to fill a final page; the font used in the scene's title card is similar to the font used by Archie. The short inspired writers Bill Oakley and Josh Weinstein to produce the season seven episode "22 Short Films About Springfield".

The Fox network censors had two objections to "The Front". The first issue was with a dream sequence in which Bart points a machine gun at Santa Claus and hijacks his sleigh. The second objection was to a scene not included in the finished episode, in which Itchy & Scratchy animators are seen observing a cat, and then putting a stick of dynamite in the cat's mouth and lighting it. As Meyers, Bart and Lisa continue down the studio's corridor, an explosion emanates from the room. The scene was cut because of the implied animal abuse, but is included as a deleted scene on the show's The Complete Fourth Season DVD box set.

Marge and Homer's high school classmate Artie Ziff makes a brief appearance in the episode; his conversation with Homer inspired the season 13 episode "Half-Decent Proposal". Artie's usual voice artist Jon Lovitz was not available, so regular cast member Dan Castellaneta provided the voice instead. The school principal, Dondelinger, was named after someone Sam Simon knew.

Cultural references

The episode focuses on animation and includes several in-jokes about The Simpsons and the animation industry in general. In a scene depicting the Itchy & Scratchy writer's lounge, each of the writers shown is a caricature of someone working on The Simpsons at the time. The joke was conceived by the show's animators. Later in the episode, Roger Meyers fires a Harvard alumnus who resembles Simpsons writer Jon Vitti. At the awards ceremony, The Simpsons creator Matt Groening is shown in the audience. Lisa is also seen reading a book titled How to Get Rich Writing Cartoons by John Swartzwelder, a Simpsons writer credited with nearly sixty episodes of the show. The credits at the end of Bart and Lisa's Itchy & Scratchy episode (shown in very small print) are a copy of the credits at the end of The Simpsons.

At the Annual Cartoon Awards, the clip from the nominated The Ren & Stimpy Show is merely a black screen with the text "clip not done yet". This was a counterattack against Ren & Stimpy creator John Kricfalusi, who had attacked The Simpsons staff by saying that "the show succeeded despite the writing", and similarly derogatory comments. Another industry reference is the "Animation Wing" door at Itchy & Scratchy studios; the door is identical to a door at the Disney animation building.

Besides copying the Simpsons credits, the Itchy & Scratchy credits also parody the sequence seen at the end of the credits of many TV shows produced by Stephen J. Cannell, where Cannell sits at the typewriter in his office and throws a sheet of paper into the air, with it forming of part of his production company's logo. In the episode, Itchy and Scratchy are seen at a desk; Scratchy pulls a sheet from his typewriter and throws it into the air, where it forms an "I & S Productions" logo. Mike Reiss later met Cannell, who was so pleased with the homage that he hugged Reiss. The title of the episode is a reference to The Front, a 1976 film about writers fronting for blacklisted writers in the 1950s. The Simpsons writers considered trying to make the episode plot resemble that of the film, but in the end decided against it.

Reception
In its original broadcast, "The Front" finished 21st in ratings for the week of April 12–18, 1993, with a Nielsen rating of 12.5, equivalent to approximately 11.6 million viewing households. It was the highest-rated show on the Fox network that week.

Warren Martyn and Adrian Wood, the authors of the book I Can't Believe It's a Bigger and Better Updated Unofficial Simpsons Guide, praised "The Front" as "an ironic look at the animation industry, with a higher than average Itchy and Scratchy count. The episode is followed by The Adventures of Ned Flanders with its own, rather wonderful, theme tune."

References

External links

 
 

The Simpsons (season 4) episodes
1993 American television episodes
Television episodes about television